Roberto D'Aubuisson Arrieta (23 August 1943 – 20 February 1992) was a neo-fascist Salvadoran soldier, politician and death squad leader. In 1981, he co-founded and became the first leader of the far-right Nationalist Republican Alliance (ARENA) and served as President of El Salvador's Constituent Assembly from 1982 to 1983. He was a candidate for President in 1984, losing in the second round to former President of the Junta José Napoleón Duarte. After ARENA's loss in the 1985 legislative elections, he stepped down in favor of Alfredo Cristiani and was awarded the honorary post of party president for life. He was named by the UN-created Truth Commission for El Salvador as having ordered the assassination of then-Archbishop Óscar Romero in 1980.

Early life
D'Aubuisson was born to Roberto d'Aubuisson Andrade, a salesman of French roots, and Joaquina Arrieta Alvarado, a career civil servant, in Santa Tecla, La Libertad Department, El Salvador, on 23 August 1943. He graduated from the national military academy in 1963. He was part of La Tandona, the class of 1966 at the Captain General Gerardo Barrios Military School. In 1972, he was trained in communications at the School of the Americas, a United States Department of Defense Institute that provides military training to government personnel in US-allied Latin American nations. After completing his studies at the Institute, he subsequently became a member of the Salvadoran military intelligence.

Death squads
D'Aubuisson involved himself in death squad activity while in the military, and he became associated with the second death squad to emerge in El Salvador in the mid–1970s, called the White Warriors Union. In October 1979, after a group of progressive officers deposed the government of Carlos Humberto Romero in a coup d'état and established the Revolutionary Government Junta (JRG, 1979–1982), D'Aubuisson was forced out of military service for his death squad connections, although he continued working for senior military commanders secretly. D'Aubuisson was regularly featured on Salvadoran television denouncing alleged traitors and Communists, who were then murdered shortly afterwards by death squads.

On 7 May 1980, six weeks after the assassination of Óscar Romero, D'Aubuisson and a group of civilians and soldiers were arrested on a farm. The raiders found weapons and documents identifying D'Aubuisson and the civilians as death squad organizers and financiers, and of planning a coup d'état to depose the JRG. D'Aubuisson was soon released from prison, after 8 of the 14 military garrison commanders voted for his release, overruling the JRG.

His opposition to the JRG gave him international infamy. In August 1981, The Washington Post reported that D'Aubuisson "openly talked of the need to kill 200,000 to 300,000 people to restore peace to El Salvador". Shortly afterwards, on September 30, he founded ARENA (Nationalist Republican Alliance), a far-right political party. D'Aubuisson accumulated much political capital among Salvadorans for his anti-leftist stridency and for his reputation as an effective counter-insurgency strategist. He often accused the JRG of being a Marxist threat to El Salvador.

He praised Hitler to West German journalists, out of belief in the Jewish Bolshevism conspiracy: "You Germans were very intelligent. You realized that the Jews were responsible for the spread of Communism and you began to kill them." He also asked every Jesuit be murdered as instruments of Communism and threatened to kill James Cheek, a State Department official under Carter.

1982 legislative election
Despite alleged electoral fraud and political violence, the 28 March 1982 Salvadoran legislative election of a Constituent Assembly was an ARENA victory, gaining them 19 of 60 seats and their allies 17 seats. D'Aubuisson's people were thus the majority, who then elected Álvaro Magaña as interim-president of El Salvador. D'Aubuisson became President of the Constituent Assembly. The JRG's government ended in May.

On 31 March 1983 Roberto D'Aubuisson was allowed entry to the United States by the State Department after deeming him not barred from entry any longer. When asked about D'Aubuisson's association with the assassination of Archbishop Romero, the State Department responded that "the allegations have not been substantiated."  In November 1993, documents by the State Department, Defense Department, and the Central Intelligence Agency were released after pressure by Congress increased. The 12,000 documents revealed that the administrations of President Reagan and President Bush knew of the assassinations conducted by Roberto D'Aubuisson, including that of Oscar Romero, and still worked with him despite this.

Presidential campaign
On 25 March 1984, D'Aubuisson began his campaign for the Salvadoran presidency. On 2 May he lost the presidential election to former President of the Junta José Napoleón Duarte of the Christian Democratic Party, receiving 46.4 percent of the vote to Duarte's 53.6 percent. D'Aubuisson claimed fraud and U.S. interference on behalf of Duarte, who was later confirmed to have been a CIA asset.
In Washington D.C., a supporter of D'Aubuisson was Senator Jesse Helms, who had close ties with D'Aubuisson's ARENA party.

Helms opposed the appointment of Thomas R. Pickering as Ambassador to El Salvador, and alleged that the CIA had interfered in the 1984 Salvadoran election in favor of Duarte, claiming that Pickering had "used the cloak of diplomacy to strangle freedom in the night". A CIA operative testifying to the Senate Intelligence Committee was alleged by Helms to have admitted rigging the election, but senators who attended stated that, whilst the CIA operative admitted involvement, the person did admit to rigging the election. Helms disclosed details of CIA financial support for Duarte, earning a rebuke from fellow senator Barry Goldwater, but Helms replied that his information came from sources in El Salvador, not the Senate committee.

On December 1984, D'Aubuisson travelled to Washington and was presented with a plaque by groups such as the American Foreign Policy Council, the Moral Majority and the Young Americans for Freedom for “continuing efforts for freedom in the face of communist aggression which is an inspiration to freedom-loving people everywhere”.

Death
D'Aubuisson died at 48 after a prolonged battle against esophageal cancer and bleeding ulcers on 20 February 1992.

Commission reports
After the Salvadoran Civil War, the United Nations Commission on the Truth for El Salvador and the Inter-American Commission on Human Rights stated that D'Aubuisson "gave the order to assassinate the Archbishop" to military officers who also tried to kill judge Atilio Ramírez Amaya "to deter investigation of the case". Views of him among  contemporary Salvadorans are mixed and often drawn across party lines; ARENA supporters revere him for his right-wing beliefs and steadfast opposition to communism, while FMLN supporters vilify him for his alleged human rights atrocities and  involvement in Archbishop Romero's assassination. On January 20, 2007, President Antonio Saca of the ARENA party paid homage to D'Aubuisson upon the anniversary of his death, promising "to continue the ARENA party, based upon his ideologic legacy." Amid opposition  debate, ARENA tried to name D'Aubuisson a "meritorious son of El Salvador", a national honor, but failed due to the efforts of protesting Church leaders and human rights workers. He was known as "Chele" (light-skinned face) and was alleged to have been a leader of anti-communist death squads that were alleged to have tortured and killed thousands of civilians before and during the Salvadoran Civil War. To political prisoners he was known as "Blowtorch Bob", due to his frequent use of a blowtorch in interrogation sessions.

In 1986, ex-U.S. ambassador Robert White reported to the United States Congress that "there was sufficient evidence" to convict D'Aubuisson of planning and ordering Archbishop Romero's assassination, describing D'Aubuisson as a pathological killer, as early as his 1984 Salvadoran presidential run. In April 2010, Alvaro Saravia, a former army captain who had admitted taking part in Romero's murder, testified in an interview with the Salvadoran newspaper El Faro that D'Aubuisson had given the order to proceed with the killing of the archbishop. Additionally, the report of the U.N. truth commission in El Salvador following the Salvadoran Civil War found that D'Aubuisson was arrested on a farm following the assassination of the archbishop, along with weapons and documents tied to the assassination.

Sons
In February 2007, D'Aubuisson's son Eduardo, along with two ARENA politicians and their driver, were killed in Guatemala. Investigators suggested that the murders may have been connected to drug-trafficking groups. In March 2015, D’Aubuisson’s surviving son, Roberto D’Aubuisson Jr., was elected mayor of Santa Tecla, a neighboring municipality of the capital San Salvador.

In popular culture 
Tony Plana was cast as Maj. Maximiliano "Max" Casanova in the movie Salvador by Oliver Stone, a thinly disguised depiction of D'Aubuisson. In the 1989 film Romero, D'Aubuisson was depicted as Lt. Columa and played by Eddie Velez.

References

External links
 "Report of the UN Truth Commission on El Salvador" (1993)
 Democracy Among the Ruins: Citizens struggle with a turbulent campaign (Mario Vargas Llosa's report on the 1984 presidential campaign), TIME, 26 March 1984 (retrieved 6 November 2006).
 Salvadoran Far-Right Leader Ill With Cancer, by Shirley Christian, The New York Times, 22 July 1991 (retrieved 6 November 2006).
 "US role in Salvador's brutal war", BBC World Service, 24 March 2002.

1944 births
1992 deaths
Counterinsurgency theorists
Deaths from cancer in El Salvador
Deaths from esophageal cancer
Nationalist Republican Alliance politicians
Presidents of the Legislative Assembly of El Salvador
People from La Libertad Department (El Salvador)
People of the Salvadoran Civil War
Salvadoran people of French descent
Fu Hsing Kang College alumni
Captain General Gerardo Barrios Military School alumni
Antisemitism in North America
Far-right politics in North America
Neo-fascist politicians
Fascism in El Salvador
20th-century Salvadoran politicians